Roadways Racing was an Australian motor racing team that competed in Australian Touring Car racing in the 1980s. It also competed in the 1986 European Touring Car Championship.

Roadways Racing
Roadways Racing’s origins can be traced back to 1976 when Tasmanian bituminous surfacing company Roadways became the title sponsor of the Gown-Hindhaugh team that raced Holden Toranas and Commodores in Australian Touring Car racing. In 1981 Roadways’ proprietor Ian Harrington bought the team. With the end of Group C in 1984 and son Steve moving to Europe to compete in Formula 3, Harrington closed the team.

Roadways Racing Services
In 1985 former Roadways Racing team manager Les Small formed Roadways Racing Services. The team prepared cars for other drivers before making its race debut at the 1985 Sandown 500. In 1986 Roadways entered the European Touring Car Championship with Allan Grice sharing the driving with Graeme Bailey and Michel Delcourt. Although funding was tight, Grice lead a number of races and usually out qualified the Mobil Holden Dealer Team Commodore of Peter Brock and Allan Moffat. During Round 3 of the ETCC at Hockenheim, Grice had a dice for the lead with the factory backed Volvo 240T turbo's of Johnny Cecotto and Ulf Granberg until a collision with a spinning backmarker ended his race with heavy damage to the front of the car. During the dice, Grice set a new touring car track record for the 6.823 km (4.24 mi) circuit where they held the German Grand Prix. His time of 2:24.74 would stand until 2000. Roadways also prepared a customer car for Bailey in which he contested a few rounds of the 1986 Australian Touring Car Championship and teamed with Grice to win the 1986 Bathurst 1000.

After a plan to contest the 1987 World Touring Car Championship with a Nissan Skyline DR30 RS fell through, Roadways and Grice returned to compete in the 1987 Australian Touring Car Championship with backing from Bob Jane T-Marts and Holden Motorsport, originally with a Holden VK Commodore SS Group A that the team had been so successful with in 1986 before upgrading to the VL model Group A Commodore early in the season. Grice put in some solid performances in the 1987 Australian Touring Car Championship, his first full championship run since 1983, but could only finish in 8th place. Grice was then joined by British driver Win Percy for the 1987 Sandown 500 where the car was out on just lap 2, before being the leading Holden qualifier and runner for the first half of the 1987 James Hardie 1000, running in either 2nd or 3rd place behind the Eggenberger Ford Sierra RS500's until a rear axle failure on lap 96 ended their race while in a strong second place.

With Grice driving a Nissan Skyline HR31 GTS-R for the Howard Marsden run Nissan Europe team in the 1988 European Touring Car Championship, the team sat out most of the season, only competing at the Bathurst 1000 and Adelaide with two TWR Commodore VLs, one for Grice and now regular co-driver Percy and one that had been built for Garry Rogers.

In 1989 Roadways completed a limited campaign with Grice driving at Winton, Bathurst and Adelaide. At the tight Winton circuit in a wet-dry-wet race, Grice put in a great showing and even led at one stage before eventually finishing 4th being the only top 10 driver not to change tyres during the race. Grice's 4th place was also the highest placing by a Holden driver in the 1989 Australian Touring Car Championship By this stage Roadways had diversified into preparing AUSCARs and NASCARs.

In a break from its Holden traditions, Roadways built a Ford EB Falcon in 1993 for the new 5.0L V8 series, but it never appeared on track.

The business has since been rebranded Advanced Vehicle Design and continues to manufacture components for racing cars in various categories including the V8 Ute Racing Series.

Bathurst 1000 Win

References

Australian auto racing teams
Sports teams in Victoria (Australia)